Peter Gill (born 8 March 1964, Liverpool, England) is an English musician. Also known by the nicknames "Pedro" or "Ped", he was the drummer with 1980s pop band Frankie Goes to Hollywood.

Frankie Goes to Hollywood enjoyed huge success in 1984 but had split by 1987, and then re-formed in 2004. Gill also formed Ltd. Noise with Paul Fishman, the former keyboardist with Re-Flex.

References

External links

1964 births
Living people
English rock drummers
Frankie Goes to Hollywood members
English new wave musicians
New wave drummers